East Island is an island of the Andaman Islands. It belongs to the North and Middle Andaman administrative district, part of the Indian union territory of Andaman and Nicobar Islands.

Just to the west across a navigable narrow coral reef channel is Landfall Island which is the northernmost island belonging to India, and to the north are the Coco Islands belonging to Myanmar.

History
The island was severely affected by the tsunami that was caused by the 2004 Indian Ocean earthquake, which led to damaged infrastructure.
East Island Lighthouse was established in 1969 and is shown from a white, round metal tower with red bands standing on the South summit of the island; a recon is situated at the light. This lighthouse marks the northern end of the Andaman Islands.

Geography
The island falls in between Coco Islands and North Andaman Island.

Administration
Politically, East Island is part of Diglipur Taluk. The village is near the Police station.

Transportation
Ship service is available from Diglipur. Ship travel is only by special demand.

Demographics 
There is only 1 village.
According to the 2011 census of India, the Island has xxx households. The effective literacy rate (i.e. the literacy rate of population excluding children aged 6 and below) is 100%.

References 

 Geological Survey of India
 

Islands of North and Middle Andaman district
Islands of India
Populated places in India
Islands of the Bay of Bengal